Leopold Melichar (5 December 1856 – 2 September 1924) was a Moravian entomologist and physician who specialized in the taxonomy of the leafhoppers. 

Melichar was born in Brno, Moravia and studied medicine in Prague before beginning practice in Vienna from 1888. He became an official in the ministry of health and in his spare time he took an interest in insects. Through the influence of Ladislav Duda he began to specialize in the leafhoppers, examining the collections of Uzel from Sri Lanka. Melichar returned to live in Brno in 1912 and during World War I he headed the local Red Cross Hospital. Melichar also collected in North Africa, Spain and around the Mediterranean and his collections were bequeathed to the Moravian Museum. Most of the taxa described by Melichar were based on external morphology and did not involve examination of the genitalia.

References 

Czech entomologists
1856 births
1924 deaths